Chen Quan (born December 1963) is a Chinese pilot selected as part of the Shenzhou program.

Chen was born in Suining, Sichuan, China.

He joined the People's Liberation Army Air Force and became a fighter interceptor pilot and later as a regiment commander in the PLAAF.

Career as an astronaut
Chen was selected to be an astronaut in 1998 and served as commander of the backup crew for Shenzhou 7 which flew in September 2008.

See also
List of Chinese astronauts

References

Chen Quan at the Encyclopedia Astronautica. Accessed 23 July 2005.
Spacefacts biography of Chen Quan

Living people
People's Liberation Army Astronaut Corps
People from Suining
Shenzhou program astronauts
People's Liberation Army Air Force personnel
1963 births